Nine Lives is the fifth studio album by Finnish progressive rock band Von Hertzen Brothers. It was released on 18 March 2013.

"Flowers and Rust", the first single from the album, won the "Anthem" award at the 2013 Progressive Music Awards.

Track listing
All music composed by Von Hertzen Brothers. All lyrics written by Von Hertzen Brothers, except "Coming Home" and "Black Heart's Cry", written by Von Hertzen Brothers and L.A. Skin.

Personnel
Mikko von Hertzen — vocals, guitars
Kie von Hertzen — guitars, vocals
Jonne von Hertzen — bass, vocals
Juha Kuoppala — keyboards
Mikko Kaakkuriniemi — drums

Additional musicians
Ville Riippa — 
William Zeitler — 

Production
James Spectrum — production; 
Von Hertzen Brothers — production
Petri Majuri — 
Mikko Raita — 
Ilkka Herkman — 
Jesse Vainio — 
Svante Forsbäck — mastering

Charts

References

2013 albums
Von Hertzen Brothers albums